Meripilus is a fungal genus in the family Meripilaceae.

Species
Meripilus applanatus Corner (1984) – South Solomons
Meripilus giganteus (Pers.) P.Karst. (1882) – Europe
Meripilus maculatus Corner (1984) – Sumatra
Meripilus sumstinei (Murrill) M.J.Larsen & Lombard (1988) – North America
Meripilus tropicalis Guzmán & Pérez-Silva (1975) – Mexico
Meripilus villosulus Corner (1984)– Peninsular Malaysia

References

Polyporales genera
Meripilaceae
Taxa named by Petter Adolf Karsten
Taxa described in 1882